The Nun is a breed of fancy pigeon developed through many years of selective breeding. It was known as the Dutch Shell Pigeon in continental Europe. Nuns, along with other varieties of domesticated pigeons, are all descendants from the rock pigeon (Columba livia).
The Nun is one of the oldest breeds and was originally a flying tumbler before being developed for exhibition. It is a mostly white breed, with a hood of feathers, which gives the name to the breed.

Description

The Nun is given its name by the raised feathers which form a kind of hood which covers the back of the neck and head, resembling a nun. Continental Europe previously referred to the Nun as the Dutch Shell Pigeon during the early part of the 20th century. It resembles the tumbler, from which this breed of pigeon originated; although as with all domestic pigeons they are descended from the rock pigeon (Columba livia). They have mostly white bodies and are designated according to the color of their head, for example, a black headed Nun, or a yellow headed Nun. Only the head, tail and the flight feathers are colored. Nuns are one breed in a group of pigeons who fly at high altitudes, along with types of tumblers and the magpie pigeon.

Female and young Nuns should be roughly the same size. The beak should be straight but stout, and the eyes a pearly white.

Charles Darwin referred to the Nun in The Variation of Animals and Plants Under Domestication, where he described how the Nun and Jacobin breeds of pigeon have evolved to have less caudal vertebrae than the rock pigeon, from which they originate.

See also 
German Nun
List of pigeon breeds

References

External links

Australian and British Nun Club
United Nun Club
Nun Pigeon Breed Guide - Pigeonpedia

Pigeon breeds